Steven Cordovano is a game designer who has worked primarily on role-playing games.

Career
In 1982, Stephan Michael Sechi, Steven Cordovano and Venie Taylor each put in $600 and formed the company Bard Games to produce their own Dungeons & Dragons supplements. Sechi and Cordovano's The Compleat Alchemist (1983) was the company's first product and presented a new character class: a magic-item maker. Due to personal and financial disagreements that arose in the wake of his completion of The Atlantis Trilogy, Sechi sold his shares in Bard Games to Cordovano and left. Cordovano decided that he did not want to run Bard Games and solid it back to Sechi a few months later.

References

External links
 

Living people
Role-playing game designers
Year of birth missing (living people)
Place of birth missing (living people)